Bulbophyllum micropetalum is a species of plant in the family Orchidaceae. It is found in Cameroon and the island of Bioko in Equatorial Guinea. Its natural habitat is subtropical or tropical moist montane forests. It is threatened by habitat loss.

References

micropetalum
Orchids of Cameroon
Orchids of Equatorial Guinea
Plants described in 1862
Endangered flora of Africa
Taxonomy articles created by Polbot